D. Sam Abrams (born 1952) is a poet, translator and critic. He is considered an authority on the Catalan language. He holds a degree in Hispanic Studies from the Autonomous University of Barcelona.

Bibliography

Poetry
Calculations... (1997)
Tot el desig a peu de plana (Into footnotes all their lust) (2002)

Edited books
Poesia anglesa i nord-americana (1994)
Veure és sentir: Àlbum Ràfols-Casamada (1994)
Dietaris de Marià Manent (2000)
Tomàs Garcés (2001)

Edited anthologies
Tenebra blanca: antologia del poema en prosa en la literatura catalana contemporània (2001)
Jo no sóc ningu. Qui ets tu? (2002), an anthology of poems of Emily Dickinson
T’estimo: Més de cent poemes d’amor i desig (2002)
La mirada estrangera (2005), a collection of foreign perspectives on Catalonia
Sagrada Emilia (2005), poetic versions of Gertrude Stein
Gebre i sol, an anthology of poems by Robert Frost

References

1952 births
Living people
Catalan–English translators
American humanities academics
Autonomous University of Barcelona alumni
20th-century American poets